Homer Carroll "Doc" Ledbetter (January 25, 1910 – October 22, 1946) was an American football player. He played college football at Arkansas and professional football in the National Football League (NFL) as a fullback and halfback for the Staten Island Stapletons in 1932 and the Chicago Cardinals in 1932 and 1933. He appeared in 17 NFL games, five as a starter. A lieutenant colonel in the Third Army during World War II, Ledbetter was killed in a car accident in 1946.

References

1910 births
1946 deaths
Arkansas Razorbacks football players
Staten Island Stapletons players
Chicago Cardinals players
Players of American football from Arkansas
United States Army personnel of World War II
United States Army colonels
Road incident deaths in Arkansas